Texas State Highway Loop 79 (Loop 79) is a state highway loop in Val Verde County in the U.S. state of Texas. The highway, which opened in 2012, serves as a bypass of Del Rio, and provides access to Laughlin Air Force Base near its southern terminus.

Route description
Loop 79 begins at an intersection with  US 277 southeast of Del Rio. The roadway travels to the north past the western edge of Laughlin Air Force Base; an interchange with  Spur 317, whose designation was extended to connect to the then-proposed Loop 79 in 2008, provides access to the military facility. Loop 79 then briefly enters Del Rio city limits, where it has an interchange with  US 90, before curving to the northwest and intersecting  RM 2523, known locally as Hamilton Lane. The route then travels through sparsely populated Val Verde County before turning to the west, crossing  US 277 / US 377 at an interchange before reaching its northern terminus at an intersection with US 90.

History
A route numbered Loop 79 was originally designated on September 25, 1939, and served as a loop in Stinnett. That designation was cancelled on June 21, 1990, when that roadway became a business route of  SH 152.

The present Loop 79 was designated by TxDOT on June 26, 2008. Construction on the route began in March 2010 and the roadway opened to traffic in April 2012. Loop 79 is classified as a super-2 highway, with interchanges at US 277 / US 377 in the north, US 90 in the east, and at the access road to Laughlin Air Force Base.

Major intersections

See also

References

079
Transportation in Val Verde County, Texas